Pseudocalotes larutensis, the Bukit Larut false garden lizard, is a species of agamid lizard. It is found in Malaysia.

References

Pseudocalotes
Reptiles of Malaysia
Reptiles described in 2001
Taxa named by Jakob Hallermann
Taxa named by Jimmy Adair McGuire